Riding the Rap is a 1995 crime fiction novel by Elmore Leonard. It is the sequel to Leonard's Pronto, released in 1993.

Synopsis 
Like Pronto, Riding the Rap centers around Harry Arno, World War II veteran and bookie, now 67 years old. The book also features a reappearance of Joyce Patton, Harry's ex-girlfriend and a former stripper, and her new boyfriend Raylan Givens, an always-gets-his-man old western type law enforcer. Givens later comes to Harry's aid when he discovers the plot set up by Chip Ganz, Bobby Deo and Louis Lewis. Ganz, who is $16,500 in debt, hatches a plan to steal the millions that Harry has skimmed from the mafia over the years from a Swiss bank account by taking him hostage and forcing the money out of him. It's up to Raylan Givens to find Harry Arno before it's too late.

Connections 
This story formed the basis of the third episode of the first season of the FX television show Justified, called "Fixer".

References

1995 American novels
Novels by Elmore Leonard
Sequel novels